Trinidad "Trina" Padilla de Sanz (June 7, 1894 in Vega Baja – April 26, 1957 in Arecibo) She was a Puerto Rican writer. She was born in Vega Baja and adopted at Arecibo; she was a piano teacher, storyteller, and poet. Daughter of the doctor and poet José Gualberto Padilla, known as "El Caribe" ("The Caribbean"). Thus, Trina Padilla de Sanz was known as "La Hija del Caribe" ("The Daughter of the Caribbean"). She studied at Ruiz Arnau high school in Arecibo. At the age of 18, she married Ángel Sanz and translated to Madrid and enrolled at Real Conservatorio and took piano classes with the professor Vasco Juan María Guelbenzu. After receiving her diploma, she returned to Puerto Rico, living in Mayagüez, San Juan and finally Arecibo, where she died.

At Arecibo, the marriage of Sanz-Padilla acquired a property that belonged to Francisco Ulanga and restored it to live in it.

Along with Librada Rodríguez and María Cadilla de Martínez she created the "Liga Femenina, Female league" with the purpose of studying women's rights and how they affect society.

She wrote for the newspaper: El Heraldo Español and collaborated with other newspapers: Alma Latina, Puerto Rico Ilustrado, El Mundo and El Imparcial.

She wrote eight books, three of them on verses: Rebeldía in 1918, De mi collar  in 1926 and Cálices abiertos in 1943. The other books are stories, narrations, chronicles of art, and one about womanhood.

She died at Arecibo on April 26, 1957 at 62 Years Old .

See also 
Puerto Rican literature

References 

1894 births
1957 deaths
People from Vega Baja, Puerto Rico
Puerto Rican people of Spanish descent
Puerto Rican nationalists
Puerto Rican poets
Puerto Rican poets by century
Puerto Rican women composers
Puerto Rican women
Puerto Rican women artists
Puerto Rican activists
19th-century journalists
Puerto Rican journalists
19th-century American women
19th-century American journalists
20th-century journalists
20th-century American women